This is a comprehensive list of victories of the  cycling team. The races are categorized according to the UCI Continental Circuits rules.

Sources:

2018 Vital Concept

Stage 1 (ITT) Sharjah Tour, Julien Morice
Stage 1 Tour of Oman, Bryan Coquard
Grand Prix de la Ville de Lillers Souvenir Bruno Comini, Jérémy Lecroq
Stage 4 4 Jours de Dunkerque, Bryan Coquard
Stage 5 Belgium Tour, Bryan Coquard
Stage 5 Tour de Savoie Mont Blanc, Quentin Pacher
Stage 4 Tour du Limousin, Lorrenzo Manzin
Omloop van het Houtland Lichtervelde, Jonas van Genechten

2019 Vital Concept–B&B Hotels

Stages 4 & 7 La Tropicale Amissa Bongo, Lorrenzo Manzin 
Stage 1 Étoile de Bessèges, Bryan Coquard
Volta Limburg Classic, Patrick Müller
Stage 2 Circuit Cycliste Sarthe - Pays de la Loire, Bryan Coquard
Overall Le Tour de Bretagne Cycliste, Lorrenzo Manzin 
Stage 4 Four Days of Dunkirk, Bryan Coquard
Grand Prix de la Somme, Lorrenzo Manzin
Stage 4 4 Jours de Dunkerque, Bryan Coquard
Grote Prijs Marcel Kint, Bryan Coquard
Stage 3 Boucles de la Mayenne, Bryan Coquard
Stage 5 Tour of Belgium, Bryan Coquard
Grand Prix Cerami, Bryan Coquard
Stage 2 Arctic Race of Norway, Bryan Coquard

2020 B&B Hotels–Vital Concept

Malaysian International Classic Race, Johan Le Bon
Stage 1 Route d'Occitanie, Bryan Coquard
 Overall Tour de Savoie Mont-Blanc, Pierre Rolland
Stage 3, Pierre Rolland

2021 B&B Hotels p/b KTM

Stages 2, 3 & 5 Tour du Rwanda, Alan Boileau
Stage 6 Tour du Rwanda, Pierre Rolland
Prologue Tour de Savoie Mont-Blanc, Maxime Chevalier
Stage 3 Tour de Savoie Mont-Blanc, Alan Boileau

2022 B&B Hotels–KTM

Stage 7 Tour du Rwanda, Alan Boileau
Stage 2 Alpes Isère Tour, Quentin Jaurégui
Stage 3 Alpes Isère Tour, Victor Koretzky
Polynormande, Franck Bonnamour
Stage 4 CRO Race, Axel Laurance

Supplementary statistics

References

Vital Concept